The Union Street Railroad Bridge is a vertical lift, Pratt through truss bridge that spans the Willamette River in Salem, Oregon, United States, built in 1912–13. It was last used by trains in the early 1990s and was sold for one dollar in 2003 to the City of Salem, which converted it to bicycle and pedestrian use in 2008–2009. It was added to the National Register of Historic Places in 2006.

History

The bridge was engineered by Waddell & Harrington, and the lift span uses their patented lift bridge design. The bridge was built for the Salem, Falls City and Western Railway (SFC&W), which was incorporated in 1901 as a logging railroad by Louis Gerlinger and Charles K. Spaulding. After the initial construction of a line between Dallas and Falls City in 1903, the line reached the formerly separate city of West Salem in 1909; passenger service across the Willamette to Salem was provided by ferry. Southern Pacific (SP) gained full control of the Salem, Falls City and Western in 1912, and built what was then known as the Salem, Falls City & Western Railway Bridge to connect the line to the Valley Main Line in 1913. The railway was not officially purchased by Southern Pacific until 1915, at which time the SFC&W line was listed in the SP timetable as an SP branch line. Since SP had acquired the Portland, Eugene and Eastern Railway (PE&E) about the same time, and SP had planned to use the PE&E name for an electric interurban network that was to rival the Oregon Electric Railway, the bridge is also known as the Portland, Eugene & Eastern Railroad Bridge.

The lift span was designed to provide a  clearance during high water conditions. The lift span has been inoperable since 1980, and sometime after 1980 the operator's house – which sat atop the lift span – was removed.

Regular service of passenger and freight trains ended in 1945. The date of the last train to cross the bridge is unknown but is believed to be in the early 1990s. The City of Salem acquired the bridge in 2003 from the Union Pacific Railroad (which absorbed Southern Pacific in 1996) for one dollar. The railroad set up a $550,000 fund for maintenance. A $3.2 million renovation and conversion project transformed it into a bicycle and pedestrian bridge linking Riverfront Park and downtown Salem on the east with Wallace Marine Park and West Salem on the west. The conversion work began in 2008 and the bridge reopened, now as pedestrian bridge, on April 18, 2009.  It closed again temporarily in November, for additional work, including removal of lead-based paint, and reopened on May 15, 2010. The bridge is also engineered to allow emergency vehicle access to supplement the Marion Street and Center Street bridges.

The Union Street Railroad Bridge and Trestle (or Salem, Falls City & Western Railroad Bridge and Trestle) was added to the National Register of Historic Places on January 11, 2006.

See also 
 List of bridges on the National Register of Historic Places in Oregon
 List of crossings of the Willamette River
 Image from west end

References

External links 

Bridge Conversion Project from the City of Salem
The Salem, Falls City and Western Railway from the City of Falls City
Historic images of the Union Street Railroad Bridge from Salem Public Library

Vertical lift bridges in Oregon
Bridges completed in 1913
Railroad bridges in Oregon
Railroad bridges on the National Register of Historic Places in Oregon
Buildings and structures in Salem, Oregon
Former railway bridges in the United States
Bridges over the Willamette River
Transportation buildings and structures in Polk County, Oregon
Transportation in Salem, Oregon
National Register of Historic Places in Salem, Oregon
Pedestrian bridges in Oregon
1913 establishments in Oregon
Drawbridges on the National Register of Historic Places
Pratt truss bridges in the United States
Metal bridges in the United States
Trestle bridges in the United States